Gonzalo Bueno (born 3 April 2004) is a Peruvian tennis player.

Bueno has a career high ATP singles ranking of 540 achieved on 21 November 2022. He also has a career high ATP doubles ranking of 560 achieved on 15 August 2022.

Bueno represents Peru at the Davis Cup, where he has a W/L record of 0–0. He won gold in both men's singles and men's doubles at the 2021 Junior Pan American Games.

References

External links

2004 births
Living people
Peruvian male tennis players
People from Trujillo, Peru